Rahadi Usman Airport or Rahadi Oesman Airport , also known as Ketapang Airport, is an airport in Ketapang, West Kalimantan, Indonesia. Rahadi Usman Airport is named after local freedom fighter, Rahadi Usman (id).

Airlines and destinations

References

External links
Rahadi Osman Airport - Indonesia Airport Global Website
 

Ketapang
Airports in West Kalimantan